Dianne Marie Alagich (born 12 May 1979) is an Australian former soccer player, who last played for Adelaide United in the W-League and the Matildas. A defender, she was capped 86 times, scoring on three occasions. She is 169 cm tall and her weight is 62 kg. She is the younger sister of former Adelaide United player Richie Alagich. On 19 December 2000, she was awarded the Australian Sports Medal.

References

External links
 
 Profile at Women's United Soccer Association

1979 births
Living people
Australian women's soccer players
Australian Institute of Sport soccer players
Adelaide United FC (A-League Women) players
Recipients of the Australian Sports Medal
San Jose CyberRays players
1999 FIFA Women's World Cup players
2003 FIFA Women's World Cup players
2007 FIFA Women's World Cup players
Olympic soccer players of Australia
Footballers at the 2000 Summer Olympics
Footballers at the 2004 Summer Olympics
Australia women's international soccer players
Expatriate women's soccer players in the United States
Australian expatriate sportspeople in the United States
Soccer players from Adelaide
Women's association football defenders
Australian expatriate women's soccer players
Sportswomen from South Australia
Women's United Soccer Association players